Cristián Alejandro Gómez Chandía (born 4 January 1978) is a Chilean footballer who played in the Primera División of Chile, Canadian Soccer League, Segunda División de Chile  and the Primera B de Chile.

Playing career 
Gómez played for several teams during his career, starting with local Coquimbo Unido. During his time in the Primera División of Chile he would play with C.D. Cobreloa, Colo-Colo, C.D. Universidad de Concepción, Everton de Viña del Mar, Ñublense, Rangers de Talca. In 2010, he played with Curicó Unido of the Primera B de Chile. The following year he went abroad to Canada to play with Brantford Galaxy of the Canadian Soccer League. At the conclusion the CSL season he returned to Chile to play with Provincial Osorno of the Segunda División de Chile. He would conclude his professional career with Curicó Unido, and Lota Schwager in the Primera B.

He gained one cap for Chile, on 14 November 2001, playing 65 minutes against Ecuador for the 2002 FIFA World Cup qualifiers. In addition, he made an appearance for Chile B in the friendly match against Catalonia on 28 December 2001.

Coaching career
From 2019 to 2021 he was the manager of Lota Schwager in both the Tercera A and the Tercera B. Since May 2022, he works as the manager of República Independiente from Hualqui in the Tercera B.

References

External links
 
 

1978 births
Living people
People from Coquimbo
Chilean footballers
Chilean expatriate footballers
Chile international footballers
Coquimbo Unido footballers
Cobreloa footballers
Colo-Colo footballers
Universidad de Concepción footballers
Everton de Viña del Mar footballers
Ñublense footballers
Rangers de Talca footballers
Curicó Unido footballers
Brantford Galaxy players
Provincial Osorno footballers
Lota Schwager footballers
Chilean Primera División players
Primera B de Chile players
Segunda División Profesional de Chile players
Canadian Soccer League (1998–present) players
Chilean expatriate sportspeople in Canada
Expatriate soccer players in Canada
Association football defenders
Chilean football managers
Lota Schwager managers